Shiren the Wanderer: The Tower of Fortune and the Dice of Fate is a roguelike role-playing video game developed by Chunsoft. It is the fifth main entry in the Shiren the Wanderer series, which is a subset of the larger Mystery Dungeon series. It was originally released for the Nintendo DS in 2010 in Japan.

An expanded version was released for the PlayStation Vita in 2015 in Japan and in 2016 in North America and Europe. A further expanded version for Nintendo Switch and Microsoft Windows, featuring additional dungeons, was released in 2020, and a Smartphone port of the latest version was released in Japan in 2022.

Gameplay 
The Tower of Fortune and the Dice of Fate is a roguelike role-playing video game in which the player traverses randomized dungeons and fights monsters. In dungeons, the player can find treasures, as well as items and equipment that they can collect and use. If the player dies, they lose their items, their level resets to one, the dungeons change, and the monsters change positions. Like in Shiren the Wanderer 4, the game has a day-and-night system; as the in-game sun sets, the player character's vision decreases, making it impossible to see enemies that are too far away. At some points in dungeons, the player needs to solve puzzles.

Plot 
The story is set between the events of Shiren the Wanderer GB2 and Shiren the Wanderer 3, and follows Shiren, a wanderer and silent protagonist, who is accompanied by Koppa, a talking ferret. The two are climbing the Tower of Fortune, as they have heard legends of a god that can change their fate. The story begins as Oyu, a young girl from a small town, suffers from an illness and Jirokichi, her childhood friend, goes forth towards the tower to change her fate. They are guided through the tower by Tao, a girl in a panda suit, and encounter other characters thorough the story: Okon and Koharu; Gen; and Kojirouta. Shiren and Jirokichi eventually climb the tower to fight against the ruler of fate himself, Reeva.

Development

Nintendo DS release
On August 31, 2010, The Tower of Fortune and the Dice of Fate was first teased as part of Sega's exhibition titles before the Tokyo Game Show 2010. Four days after the teasing, Chunsoft opened a new website for the game, with details about its gameplay, new characters and location updated occasionally there, and a release date set for December of the same year. During an interview with Koichi Nakamura, it was confirmed that this game and Shiren the Wanderer 4 were developed simultaneously, though it was hard to come up with new ideas for the former title. In that case, they have added back items and monsters originally featured in the latter. This would be re-confirmed by the game's director, Yoriki Daigo, in a blog posted by the company. Unique to this series is the possibility to play with another player locally in co-op mode, compared to Shiren the Wanderer 3 who had a similar option exclusively for the versus mode. Pre-ordered copies of the game were bundled with a soundtrack CD and a booklet about the series' history. As a crossover promotion, a Nonary Game bracelet from Chunsoft's Nine Hours, Nine Persons, Nine Doors was included as an in-game item.

PlayStation Vita port
In commemoration of the 20th anniversary of the Shiren the Wanderer series, a PlayStation Vita version titled Shiren the Wanderer 5 Plus, which includes additional dungeons and the ability to look around using the right stick, was announced in December 2014. It was released by Spike Chunsoft later in Japan in 2015, then by Aksys Games a year after as Shiren the Wanderer: The Tower of Fortune and the Dice of Fate.

Nintendo Switch and Steam ports
The idea of porting the game to other consoles comes from when Sony ended production of the PlayStation Vita in 2019. In August 2019, during an event promoting Steam China at The International 2019 Dota 2 Tournament held in Shanghai, a Microsoft Windows version was implied to be in development, although no official announcement had been made at the time. Later, on March 26, 2020, a Nintendo Switch version was announced, featuring new dungeons. A localization of the Nintendo Switch version was announced on June 23, 2020, during the Tokyo Game Show 2020, as well as confirmation of the Microsoft Windows version. It was released worldwide on December 2, 2020, a day after the franchise's 25th anniversary. More details were shared to the ports; they would feature three brand new dungeons, a livestream display and the game being translated in both traditional and simplified Chinese, making it the first Shiren the Wanderer game to have an official Chinese translation. A limited-time, physical copy of the game in English held by Limited Run Games would later be released on January 12, 2021

Mobile port
In March 2022, it was revealed that the Nintendo Switch and Windows versions of this game would receive an iOS and Android port. It was released a day prior to its announcement exclusively in Japan, even if it can be played in English and Chinese. Some changes include auto saving, the ability to play it horizontally or vertically compared to the smartphone release of Mystery Dungeon: Shiren the Wanderer, among smaller ones.

Release 
The game was originally released in Japan by Chunsoft for the Nintendo DS on December 9, 2010. The PlayStation Vita version was released by Spike Chunsoft on June 4, 2015 in Japan, and by Aksys Games on July 26, 2016 in North America and Europe. Since 2020, the game would be released only by Spike Chunsoft, and excludes Aksys Games for its western release. The Nintendo Switch and Steam version were released worldwide on December 2, 2020, and a day later in Japan, and the smartphone versions were released on March 29, 2022 exclusively in Japan.

Reception 

The game was well received by critics on PlayStation Vita and Nintendo Switch, according to review aggregator Metacritic, where it was the sixth-best reviewed PlayStation Vita game of 2016.

Sales
Across all versions of The Tower of Fortune and the Dice of Fate, it has sold over 500,000 copies as of December 2022, making it selling as many copies as all versions of Mystery Dungeon: Shiren the Wanderer accumulated. The Nintendo DS version sold 65,137 copies by the end of 2011 and an additional 16,573 copies sold from the Chunsoft Selection edition of the same game by the end of 2012, granting a total of 81,710 copies sold in Japan. The PlayStation Vita version debuted on second place on Media Create's weekly list of best-selling video games in Japan, with 16,224 copies sold; on its second week, it sank to ninth place with 6,060 copies, and on its third it sank to thirteenth place with 3,553 copies sold. By the end of 2015, it was the 168th best selling game of the year in Japan with 25,681 copies. The Nintendo Switch version debuted on twelfth place on Famitsu's weekly list of best-selling video games in Japan, with 19,594 copies sold. This version would also be placed sixth on the Japanese Nintendo eShop's Top 20 best-selling games of December 2020. According to Steam Spy, the Steam release has sold over 100,000 copies.

Notes

References

External links 
 Archived  for the Nintendo DS version .
 Archived  for the PlayStation Vita version.
  for the Nintendo Switch and Steam versions .
  for the Smartphone versions .

2010 video games
Chunsoft games
Spike Chunsoft video games
Nintendo DS games
Nintendo Switch games
PlayStation Vita games
Windows games
iOS games
Android (operating system) games
Roguelike video games
Role-playing video games
Video games developed in Japan
Video games scored by Hayato Matsuo
Mystery Dungeon
Video games using procedural generation